The Little Scioto River is a tributary of the Ohio River, about  long, in southern Ohio in the United States.

The Little Scioto River rises in western Jackson County and flows generally southwardly into Scioto County, near Minford.

The United States Board on Geographic Names settled on "Little Scioto River" as the stream's name in 1913.  According to the Geographic Names Information System, the Little Scioto has also been known historically as "Brushy Fork," "Little Siota River" and "Little Sciota River."

See also
 List of rivers of Ohio
 Scioto River

References

Rivers of Ohio
Tributaries of the Ohio River
Rivers of Jackson County, Ohio
Rivers of Scioto County, Ohio